"Whiskey Crime" is a song by American singer-songwriter Steve Grand from his debut studio album, All American Boy (2015). It was written solely by Grand, while production was helmed by Aaron Johnson. The song was released as a promotional single on March 10, 2015, coinciding with the preorder of its parent album.

Background and composition
The song premiered on Idolator on March 9. Upon the release of the song Grand has commented “I’ve been looking forward to releasing ‘Whiskey Crime’ to my fans for a long time. There are a lot of things about this song I think people will love,” Grand says about the tune. “I wrote the drum part note for note, and I think it makes for a really unique groove that will catch the listener’s attention, in addition to making actual drummers scratch their heads.”

Credits and personnel
Steve Grand – writer, lead vocals, background vocals, piano, percussion, programming, digital editing
Aaron Johnson – producer, digital editing, engineering
Tim Palmer – mixing at 1962 Studios (Austin)
Justin Shturtz – mastering at Sterling Sound (New York City)
Zac Rae – keyboard
Tim Pierce – guitar
Jim McGorman – guitar
Marc Slutsky – drums
Sean Hurley – bass
Chris Steffen – engineering
Adrian Trujillo – assistant engineer
Bill Mims – assistant engineer
Dan Piscina – assistant engineer
Sam Martin – assistant engineer

Credits and personnel adapted from All American Boy album liner notes.

Release history

References

2015 songs
2015 singles
Steve Grand songs
American rock songs
LGBT-related songs